William Wallace Ellsberry (December 18, 1833 – September 7, 1894) was an American physician and politician and a U.S. Representative from Ohio for one term from 1885 to 1887.

Early life and career 
Born in New Hope, Ohio, Ellsberry attended the public schools of Brown County and a private academy in Clermont County.
He taught school two years.
Began the study of medicine with his father.
He attended medical lectures and graduated from the Cincinnati College of Medicine and Surgery, and later from the Ohio Medical College.
He engaged in the practice of his profession at Georgetown, Ohio, until his election to Congress.
County auditor.
He served as delegate to the Democratic National Convention in 1880.

Congress
Ellsberry was elected as a Democrat to the Forty-ninth Congress (March 4, 1885 – March 3, 1887).
He was not a candidate for renomination in 1886.

Later career and death 
He resumed the practice of medicine until his death in Georgetown, Ohio, September 7, 1894.
He was interred in Confidence Cemetery.

References

1833 births
1894 deaths
Physicians from Ohio
University of Cincinnati College of Medicine alumni
People from Brown County, Ohio
19th-century American politicians
People from Georgetown, Ohio
Democratic Party members of the United States House of Representatives from Ohio